Jay Sarno (July 2, 1922 – July 21, 1984) was an American developer, hotelier and casino owner. He developed and owned the Atlanta Cabana Motel in Atlanta, Georgia, as well as several motels in California and Texas. He was the founder of the Caesars Palace hotel and the Circus Circus in Las Vegas, Nevada.

Early life
Sarno was born in 1922 in St. Joseph, Missouri. His parents were Jewish immigrants from Poland. His father was a cabinet maker, his mother a homemaker.

Sarno graduated from the University of Missouri, with a degree in business. While in college, he met Stanley Mallin, who would become his lifelong friend and business partner. During World War II, he joined the United States Army and served in the Pacific theatre alongside Mallin.

Career
With Stanley Mallin, Sarno became a tile contractor in Miami, Florida. They subsequently built subsidized housing in Atlanta, Georgia. In 1958, after they had met Jimmy Hoffa and Allen Dorfman, they built the Atlanta Cabana Motel in Atlanta with a loan from the Central States Pension Fund. They went on to build Cabanas in Palo Alto, California, and another motel in Dallas, Texas.

Sarno developed the Caesars Palace Hotel in Las Vegas, Nevada. It was inaugurated on August 5, 1966.

Sarno later developed the Circus Circus. The attraction featured a circus tent with daily acts, and Sarno would dress up as a ringmaster and attend to families and children personally. Sarno subsequently leased it to Bill Pennington and Bill Bennett, a Del Webb executive, and they purchased it in 1983.

Sarno planned to develop the "Grandissimo", a new hotel and casino with 6,000 rooms. However, the project was shelved when Sarno died.

Personal life
Sarno married Joyce Sarno Keys; they later divorced. They had four children: Jay Sarno Jr, September Sarno, Heidi Sarno Straus, and Freddie Sarno.

Death and legacy
Sarno died of a heart attack on July 21, 1984, at the age of 62, at Caesars Palace.

Sarno was posthumously elected to the Gaming Hall of Fame in 1989. He received, also posthumously, the inaugural Sarno Award for Casino Design from the Global Gaming Expo in 2003.

Filmography
Diamonds Are Forever (1971) - Sideshow Barker (uncredited)

Further reading

References

1922 births
1984 deaths
People from St. Joseph, Missouri
People from Las Vegas
University of Missouri alumni
Businesspeople from Nevada
American entertainment industry businesspeople
American casino industry businesspeople
20th-century American businesspeople
American real estate businesspeople
American people of Jewish descent
United States Army personnel of World War II